St. James Episcopal Church is a historic church at 155 N. 6th Street in Zanesville, in the U.S. state of Ohio.

It was built in 1843 and added to the National Register in 1978.

References

Churches completed in 1843
Episcopal churches in Ohio
Churches on the National Register of Historic Places in Ohio
Gothic Revival church buildings in Ohio
National Register of Historic Places in Muskingum County, Ohio
Churches in Zanesville, Ohio
19th-century Episcopal church buildings
1843 establishments in Ohio